The 2015 Karshi Challenger was a professional tennis tournament played on hard courts. It was the ninth edition of the tournament which was part of the 2015 ATP Challenger Tour. It took place in Qarshi, Uzbekistan between 4 and 10 May 2015.

Singles main-draw entrants

Seeds

 1 Rankings are as of April 27, 2015.

Other entrants
The following players received wildcards into the singles main draw:
  Sagadat Ayap
  Sanjar Fayziev
  Temur Ismailov
  Jurabek Karimov

The following players received entry from the qualifying draw:
  Yaraslav Shyla
  Sergey Betov
  Denis Matsukevich
  Riccardo Ghedin

The following player received entry as a lucky loser:
  Ivan Gakhov

Doubles main-draw entrants

Seeds

1 Rankings as of April 27, 2015.

Other entrants
The following pairs received wildcards into the doubles main draw:
  Sanjar Fayziev /  Jurabek Karimov
  Temur Ismailov /  Shonigmatjon Shofayziyev
  Sagadat Ayap /  Timur Khabibulin

Champions

Singles

  Teymuraz Gabashvili def.  Evgeny Donskoy, 5–2 retired

Doubles

  Yuki Bhambri /  Adrián Menéndez Maceiras def.  Sergey Betov /  Mikhail Elgin, 5–7, 6–3, [10–8]

External links
Official Website

Karshi Challenger
Karshi Challenger